Apatelodes torrefacta, the spotted apatelodes, is a moth in the family Apatelodidae. The species was first described by Smith in 1797. It is found in North America from Maine and southern Ontario to Florida, west to Texas, and north to Wisconsin.

The wingspan is 32–42 mm. Adults are on wing from May to August. There are two generations per year in the south and one in the north.

The larvae feed on Fraxinus, Prunus, Acer and Quercus species.

Gallery

Sources

Apatelodidae
Moths described in 1797
Moths of North America